The girls' monobob competition of the bobsleigh events at the 2016 Winter Youth Olympics was held at the Lillehammer Olympic Bobsleigh and Luge Track, on 20 February. 15 athletes from 9 different countries took part in this event.

Results
The race was started at 10:00.

References

Girls' monobob